This page shows the lieutenant-general insignia, by country, for the rank of lieutenant general in the different branches of the armed forces.

Air force

Army

Naval infantry

References

External links 
 

Military ranks